Kathryn Harby-Williams  (born 16 July 1969) is an Australian netball player and television presenter. She captained the Australian netball team.

Harby-Williams currently works with Radio Sport New Zealand and is a Sky TV commentator for Sky Sport 1's live netball coverage of the ANZ Championship and international tests, along with former Silver Ferns ] and Anna Stanley, and with co-Australian national representative Natalie Avellino; she also co-hosts the weekly netball show On Court with Stanley. One of the most successful players of her era, she represented Australia for twelve years (95 caps) in her usual positions of goal defence and wing defence, including four years as captain from 2000 to 2003. She was victorious at two World Championships in 1995 and 1999, and part of the team winning gold at the Commonwealth Games in 1998 and 2002. She was named Australian International Player of the Year in 2001.

Stemming from her failure to be selected in a representative team in her teenage years, she would take 100 sprints up a 30-metre hill as a regular pre-season training. At another time after spraining her ankle in a match against New Zealand, despite missing court training she managed to put in four kilometres in the pool next day.

She was the inaugural captain of the Adelaide Thunderbirds in the Commonwealth Bank Trophy national league from 1997 until 2003, after she retired from Australian netball and moved to New Zealand to take up a position as a reporter with the Sport 365 news programme.

Harby-Williams made a brief comeback in New Zealand, playing two seasons with the Auckland Diamonds in New Zealand's national league, the National Bank Cup. At the age of 34 she was selected as the league's most valuable defence player. She announced her retirement at the end of the 2005 season in order to focus on pursuing her television and radio career, but returned to the Diamonds in 2006. She was inducted into the Australian Netball Hall of Fame in 2010.

After returning to Australia in 2013 for commentating for Sky Sports NZ, she starting commentating for Fox Sports in the ANZ Championship. Harby-Williams is also a selector for the Australian National team.

In the 2018 Queen's Birthday Honours Harby-Williams was made a Member of the Order of Australia (AM) for "significant service to netball as a player, national captain, coach, commentator, board member and player's advocate".

References

1969 births
Living people
Netball players at the 1998 Commonwealth Games
Netball players at the 2002 Commonwealth Games
Commonwealth Games gold medallists for Australia
Commonwealth Games medallists in netball
Australia international netball players
Members of the Order of Australia
Netball players at the 1993 World Games
Netball players from South Australia
Adelaide Thunderbirds players
Auckland Diamonds players
Australian netball commentators
Contax Netball Club players
Esso/Mobil Superleague players
South Australia state netball league players
Australian expatriate netball people in New Zealand
Australian netball administrators
1995 World Netball Championships players
1999 World Netball Championships players
2003 World Netball Championships players
Medallists at the 1998 Commonwealth Games
Medallists at the 2002 Commonwealth Games